Aeroput was an airline and flag carrier of Yugoslavia from 1927 until 1948.

Society for Air traffic AD Aeroput was the first Serbian company for civil air traffic, which was founded on 17 June 1927 as Društvo za Vazdušni Saobraćaj "Aeroput", in the palace of the Adriatic-Danube Bank in Belgrade. Aeroput was the national carrier of the Kingdom of SHS, and then the Kingdom of Yugoslavia. Aeroput was among the first civilian aircraft carriers, being the 10th airline company founded in Europe and the 21st in the world.
The airline ceased to exist during World War II in Yugoslavia, but was renewed after the war under the new name Jugoslovenski Aerotransport (abbreviated JAT) and still flies today as the Serbian national air carrier under the name Air Serbia.

The beginning and development of the Serbian civil aviation
On 13 February 1913, king Peter I of Serbia adopted the Regulation of the transportation system of devices which run in the air, which made Kingdom of Serbia joining the modern air traffic. It was the fifth country in the world (after Germany, England, France and Austria-Hungary), which regulated legal norms of the air operations. For the Kingdom of Serbia, it was a defense mechanism from Austro-Hungarian planes, which had been flying over Serbian territory, without any permission, since November 1912, as Austro-Hungarian Empire was putting pressure on Serbia to withdraw from the coast of the Adriatic Sea, where Serb units were stationed after the victory over the Turks in the First Balkan War.

The first civilian aircraft to fly over Serbia before the end of World War I postal service flights carrying mail. In cooperation with the Postal and Telegraphic Department several flights were organized in Thessaloniki, where pilots of the First Serbian Squadron, AP 521, carried mail between Skopje and Thessaloniki. When the Kingdom of Serbs, Croats and Slovenes was established in December 1918, two-seaters Breguet 14 flew a regular route from Novi Sad through Belgrade and Niš to Skopje almost daily. After that, a postal air service from Novi Sad and Belgrade to Sarajevo, Mostar and Zagreb was established. Passenger transport began in 1919.

Before an airport in Bežanija suburb of Belgrade was built, a temporary solution was found in an airfield in the village of Jabuka near Pančevo. The airfield included a 500 by 500 meters grass field by the side of the road, that was used for grazing livestock, except for the brief periods when the airplanes were landing or taking off, as was the case in Prague and other cities. First flight landed at this impromptu airport on 25 March 1919, operating a Blériot-SPAD S.46 Berline biplane. The location of this airfield was not convenient for passengers, since, in absence of a bridge over the Danube, the travel by ship to Belgrade often lasted longer than the air travel from Budapest or Bucharest.

The first international route that passed through the territory of the Kingdom of SHS was opened by Compagnie Franco-Roumaine. In order to compete with the Orient Express train line, which was for a long time the fastest link between Western Europe and the Middle East, this company introduced world's first regular night flights on the Belgrade-Bucharest route. A three-engine Caudron C.61 took off from Bucharest at 4.00 am and landed in Pančevo at 9.00 am, on 9 September 1923. That same year, the construction of the airport along the road to Bežanija began.

Establishment of Aeroput
In a conference held on 6 February 1926 by the initiative of Serbian Aero-Club the rules of air traffic were created, and all participants become the founders of the new airline company, Aeroput. The rules were approved on 13 March by the Ministry of Trade and Industry. The company was registered on the Belgrade stock market. However, the registration of shares went below expectations and it became clear that the company needed assistance in cash and goods from the state. This agreement was signed on 25 January 1927, but subscription of shares was still low. The planned and required 24,000 shares (i.e. the then six million dinars required to purchase aircraft) by the end of March 1927, there were subscribed and paid only about 10% of the shares, which, in accordance with the law of joint stock companies, threatened Aeroput to be abolished.

Transcontinental flight 

Aeroput director and co-founder, aeronautical engineer Tadija Sondermajer, a reserve colonel in the Royal Yugoslav Army Air Force and the most prominent figure in the civil aviation of Serbia and the Kingdom of Yugoslavia at the time, suggested that along with Russian pilot Leonid Bajdak, they flew an intercontinental flight from Paris to Bombay. This was put forward in order to both prove the value and ability of Serbian pilots and generate publicity in order to promote the uptake of Aeroput shares. After a short preparation, Sondermajer and Bajdak commenced their transcontinental from Paris on 20 April 1927. After covering 14,800 kilometers with 14 stages and 11 days of travel, on 2 May 1927 they landed in Belgrade. More than 30,000 Belgrade citizens welcomeed the two pilotes with a heroes welcome at the Bežanijska Kosa airport. The journey achieved its goal and subscriptions of Aeroput shares grew exponentially. From that point onwards, Aeroput was established with a capital of six million dinars, collected by 412 shareholders. The holders of the shares were: Vračarska Zadruga (Vračar Cooperative), Economic Bank, Postal Savings Bank, Gateret, Serbian bank of Zagreb, American-Serbian bank in Sarajevo, Teleoptik, Velauto, Ikarus, Technical Society Voks and others. A total of 412 shareholders paid the 14,000 shares at a price of 250 dinars, totalling 3.5 million dinars. Aeroput began its service by purchasing four planes. For the next three months 30,000 shares were sold and this capital enabled the new company to overcome initial financial hurdles. On 17 June 1927, Aeroput presented themselves to Belgrade Commercial Court and from that day onwards, the Company for became a legal entity.

Construction of the airport
The new Belgrade international airport was officially opened on 25 March 1927, with flights of a total of 25 fighter aircraft of type Dewoitine, and became the first civilian airport in the country. It included a large hangar which was designed by Serbian scientist Milutin Milanković, who until then has been abroad engaged in the development of similar projects, and developed the world's first formula for determining the reinforcement of concrete beams. The airport was built on a meadow called Dojno Polje between Bežanijska Kosa and left bank of the Sava River, about two kilometers from Zemun. Airport had four grass runways. In 1931, a modern terminal building was built, and in 1936, the airport installed equipment for landing in poor visibility conditions.

The first promotional flight
The first Aeroput aircraft arrived at Belgrade airport by early February 1928. Aeroput management bought four Potez 29/2 biplanes from the French company Potez. The choice of this type of aircraft on behalf of the management of Aeroput was decided because the domestic factory Ikarus in Zemun already produced planes under license from the same French company, the aircraft of type Potez 25, for the Air Force Command and its air force units. For Aeroput it was important that the factory was in the immediate vicinity of the airport and was capable of servicing their new aircraft. Biplane Potez 29/2 in that time had good characteristics for a passenger plane, the crew made up of two members, had five passenger seats, a range up to 500 kilometers, with a 450 hp engine, flying at a speed of 210 kilometers per hour, and the trunk capable of receiving load of 250 kilograms.

Aeroput's first flight was a promotional flight that took off from Belgrade to Zagreb at 9 o'clock in the morning on 15 February 1928 with an aircraft Potez 29/2, with license plate X-SECD, called "Belgrade". The pilots were Aeroput's chairman Tadija Sondermajer and pilot Vladimir Striževski Striž, while the first passengers were five journalists and photo reporters from Belgrade media. After a two-hour flight by overcast sky and low clouds over the Sava River, which is a major landmark for pilots, they noticed the towers the Zagreb cathedral. The plane landed at the airport Borongaj at 11 o'clock, which was 25 minutes earlier than schedule, thus making a couple of exhibition passes over Zagreb. The plane was greeted by a large number of citizens and representatives of the civil and military authorities. On the same day in the afternoon a group of journalists flew from Zagreb to Belgrade. This marked the promotion of Aeroput's first regular line of domestic air traffic. Belgrade - Zagreb line was flown daily, except Sundays, until November, when due to the winter conditions, air traffic was disrupted. Despite the high ticket prices and passenger fear of flying, the number of passengers has been higher than expected, with more than 80 percent of the seats filled.

History
The first route, Belgrade - Zagreb, became operational on 15 February 1928. The following year, 1929, Aeroput joined the International Air Traffic Association (IATA). The first international flight was on the 7 October 1929, when Aeroput flew from Belgrade via Zagreb to Vienna with a Potez 29/2 with five-passengers. By 1930, Aeroput had regular flights from Belgrade to Graz and Vienna (via Zagreb), and to Thessaloniki (via Skoplje). Thus the shortest air link between Central Europe and the Aegean Sea was formed across the Yugoslav territory. By then, Aeroput connected Belgrade and Zagreb with routed to all other major domestic centers in the interior and the coast of the Adriatic. Initially, the fleet consisted of three Potez 29/2 biplanes with five passenger seats. In 1932 Aeroput expanded its fleet with Farman F.306 aircraft, and in 1934 the company purchased three Spartan Cruiser II planes. Aeroput also bought two Caudron C.449 Goéland monoplanes, one de Havilland DH.89 Dragon Rapide and six mid-range Lockheed Model 10A Electra aircraft. Relying on its renewed fleet, the company greatly expanded its list of destinations in 1937 and 1938. Regular flights to Sofia, Tirana, and Budapest were introduced, as well as a seasonal-tourist flight Dubrovnik - Zagreb - Vienna - Brno - Prague. In cooperation with Italian and Romanian companies, the Bucharest - Belgrade - Zagreb - Venice - Milan - Turin route was introduced.

In 1940, Aeroput broke all records by carrying over 16,000 passengers and 232 tons of freight by flying 726,000 aircraft-kilometers.

The impressive development of the company was interrupted by the start of the Second World War. Aeroput suspended all services after the April War at beginning of the World War II in Yugoslavia in April 1941. After occupation of Yugoslavia in April 1941, the airline effectively ceased to exist, and its aircraft were seized by the Axis powers. After the war, the airline was rebranded and reestablished in 1947 as JAT Yugoslav Airlines. JAT was established with the assistant of the Yugoslav transport regiment and former Aeroput pilots and aircraft mechanics.

Establishment of Aeroput Technical service

In the first three years, while the fleet consisted only of Potez 29/2 biplanes, major aircraft maintenance for Aeroput was performed by aircraft factory Ikarus in Zemun, which had licence for producing a similar plane Potez 25 for the Royal Yugoslav Air Force (JKRV). Engine maintenance was performed at the factory Jasenica AD from Smederevska Palanka, which also produced under licence aircraft engines of the Lorraine brand. Early in 1931, Aeroput acquired a workshop for the repair of the aircraft from the French - Romanian company CIDNA, which was located at Zemun airport and assembly organized with the mechanics of Ikarus and the Air Force, and in that way organized its own technical aircraft maintenance service. Maintenance department was located in one of the large hangar at the civilian part of the airport, it was a modern and possessed a test stand for aero-engines. Since then, all the revisions, and airplane engines overhauling that had Aeroput were performed in they own technical service. How it was the good service, show fact that they are made in the service aircraft of domestic design, the Aeroput MMS-3.

World War II and postwar prohibition
Bombing in 1941 destroyed almost the entire property of the company. Due to the outbreak of war, 500 tons of fuel which were ordered and paid, never arrived. Aeroput sued for punitive damages on 31 October 1941. In 1942 the commissar administration banned Aeroput operations. German occupation authorities nationalized the property of Aeroput in Knez Mihailova Street 32, where they moved their national airlineDeutsche Luft Hansa (DHN).

After the war Aeroput renewed work on 2 July 1945, and a general meeting of shareholders elected the first post-war management of the company. The meeting was attended by delegates of the new government of Democratic Federative Yugoslavia (DFY), and with the participation of then the Head of State Ivan Ribar, who was a pre-war shareholder and board member. However, the later communist government of the Federal People's Republic of Yugoslavia adopted a decree prohibiting private joint-stock companies, and on 24 December 1948 Aeroput was liquidated. Its assets were nationalized and the airline continued as Jat Airways.

Fleet
 Aeroput MMS-3 - One prototype aircraft from 1936 until it was destroyed in the April War.
 Breguet 19/10 - One aircraft from 1934 to 1937.
 Caudron C.449 Goéland - Two aircraft from 1937, one damaged in 1939 the other captured during 1941 April War.
 de Havilland DH.80A Puss Moth - One aircraft from 1931 to 1933
 de Havilland DH.60M Moth - One aircraft from 1931 until it was destroyed in April War on 6 April 1941
 de Havilland DH.83 Fox Moth - One aircraft from 1941 until it was destroyed in April War on 6 April 1941
 de Havilland DH.89 Dragon Rapide - One aircraft from 1936 until it was captured in the April War in 1941
 Farman F.190 - One aircraft from 1937 to 1941.
 Farman F.306 - One aircraft from 1933 that crashed in near Ljubljana on 12 September 1933
 Lockheed Model 10 Electra - Eight different aircraft with the first two delivered in 1937, two had left by 1940, four were impressed into service with the Royal Air Force in May 1941 and two were destroyed in 1941 in the April War.
 Potez 29/2 - Six aircraft operated from 1928 to 1929.
 Spartan Cruiser II - Two aircraft from 1933 to 1941, an additional aircraft was built in 1935 under Spartan's licence for Aeroput by Zmaj aircraft company in Zemun, it crashed on 15 July 1936.

Exhibits from this period can be found in the Aeronautical Museum-Belgrade (with a collection of over 200 planes, gliders and helicopters).

Destinations

Aeroput aperated in the domestic airports and airfields of Belgrade, Ljubljana, Zagreb, Sarajevo, Skopje, Borovo, Sušak, Dubrovnik (Gruda), Podgorica, Niš and Split; along with domestic seaplane stations at Belgrade, Dubrovnik, Split, Divulje, Sušak, Kumbor (Kotor) and Vodice (Šibenik).

Regular flights were made from Belgrade and Zagreb to domestic destinations but also to international ones, to Thessaloniki, Graz, Vienna, Athens, Sofia, Trieste, Venice, Rome, Prague, Brno, Budapest, Klagenfurt and Tirana.

In 1938, Aeroput was a partner along Italian company Ala Littoria and Romanian CIDNA in the Milan-Venice-Zagreb-Belgrade-Bucharest route.

Destinations by the year they were introduced:

1928:
Belgrade – Zagreb

1929:
Zagreb – Belgrade – Skoplje

1930:
Belgrade – Zagreb – Graz – Vienna
Zagreb – Sušak
Belgrade – Sarajevo – Podgorica
Belgrade – Skoplje – Thessaloniki

1931:
Belgrade – Sarajevo – Split – Sušak – Zagreb
Vienna – Belgrade – Thessaloniki

1933:
Belgrade – Skoplje – Thessaloniki – Athens
Zagreb – Ljubljana
Ljubljana – Sušak

1934:
Ljubljana – Zagreb – Sušak
Ljubljana – Klagenfurt

1935:
Belgrade – Borovo – Zagreb – Graz – Vienna (Borovo was added to the Belgrade – Vienna route)
Belgrade – Niš – Skoplje (Niš was added to the Belgrade – Skoplje route)
Belgrade – Skoplje – Bitola – Thessaloniki (Bitola was added once a week, on Sundays)
Belgrade – Sarajevo

1936:
Belgrade – Podujevo – Skoplje
Belgrade – Sarajevo – Dubrovnik
Belgrade – Borovo – Zagreb – Sušak – Ljubljana

1937:
Zagreb – Sarajevo – Dubrovnik

1938:
Belgrade – Sofia
Dubrovnik – Sarajevo – Zagreb – Vienna – Brno – Prague
Belgrade – Dubrovnik – Tirana

1939:
Budapest – Zagreb – Venice – Rome
Belgrade – Budapest

See also
Jat Airways

References

External links
 Jat Airways
 Timeline of Aeroput baggage labels
 Civil Aircraft Register - Yugoslavia

Airlines of Yugoslavia
Airlines established in 1927
Airlines disestablished in 1948
1927 establishments in Yugoslavia
1948 disestablishments in Yugoslavia